Jessica Louise Nelson (born 14 June 1991) is an English singer who rose to prominence as a member of the girl group Little Mix from 2011 to 2020. Before joining Little Mix, Nelson landed two acting roles as an extra in About a Boy in 2002 and in Harry Potter and the Goblet of Fire in 2005, both of which are uncredited for. In 2011, she auditioned as a solo act for the eighth series of The X Factor UK, and was placed into a group with three other contestants to form the girl group Little Mix, who made history by becoming the first group to win the British version of the series.

As part of Little Mix, Nelson achieved five number-one singles on the UK Singles Chart and released a BBC One documentary titled Jesy Nelson: Odd One Out, which documented her experiences with body image and online bullying. It won the Factual Entertainment Award at the 25th National Television Awards and also a Visionary Honour Award for Documentary of the Year. Shortly after her departure from the group, Nelson signed to Republic Records. She was formerly signed to Polydor Records in 2021 but left a year later because of creative differences. In October 2021, she released her debut single "Boyz" featuring rapper Nicki Minaj, which debuted and peaked at number four on the UK Singles Chart.

Early life
Jessica Louise Nelson was born in Romford, East London, on 14 June 1991, to John Nelson, a businessman, and Janis Nelson, a police community support officer. Her parents separated when she was five. She is the second youngest of four children with an older sister Jade, an older brother Jonathan and a younger brother Joseph.

Nelson attended Jo Richardson Community School and Abbs Cross Academy and Arts College in Hornchurch, London. She also attended the Sylvia Young and Yvonne Rhodes Theatre Schools. Prior to auditioning for The X Factor, Nelson worked as a barmaid in Dagenham. In 2020, Nelson said that, as a child, she had small roles as an extra in About a Boy (2002) and Harry Potter and the Goblet of Fire (2005).

Career

2011–2020: Little Mix and departure

Her first audition was "Bust Your Windows" by Jazmine Sullivan, and successfully auditioned as a soloist for the eighth series of the UK version of The X Factor in front of judges Louis Walsh, Gary Barlow, Tulisa Contostavlos and Kelly Rowland, but failed the first challenge of the "bootcamp" section to progress through to the Girls category (solo females aged 16–24). Nelson and Perrie Edwards were put in a group called "Faux Pas" while Jade Thirlwall and Leigh-Anne Pinnock were to be put in a group named "Orion". Both groups, however, failed to progress. A later decision by the judges recalled two members from each group to form the four-piece group Rhythmix, sending them through to the "judges' houses" section. They eventually reached the live shows and were mentored by Tulisa Contostavlos. On 28 October 2011, it was announced that the band's new name would be Little Mix. On 11 December 2011, Little Mix were announced as the winners, making them the first band ever to win the British version of the show.

After winning the show, Little Mix signed a record deal with Syco Music, owned by Simon Cowell. Since joining Little Mix, Nelson has faced cyber-bullying and struggled to cope during her time on The X Factor. Nelson released six albums with the group; DNA (2012), Salute (2013), Get Weird (2015), Glory Days (2016), LM5 (2018) and Confetti (2020) The last of which was released a month before she left the group. 

Nelson released her documentary on BBC Three in 2019, titled Jesy Nelson: Odd One Out. The documentary was based on her experiences with body image and online bullying. It was BBC Three's top factual title since the channel moved online and on BBC One it was watched by 3.3 million viewers. The documentary won the Factual Entertainment Award at the 25th National Television Awards.

In December 2020, she announced her departure from the group due to prolonged issues with her mental health. She said: "I find the constant pressure of being in a girl group and living up to expectations very hard."

2021–present: Solo projects and upcoming debut album
In May 2021, she announced that she had signed a record deal with Polydor Records and that she is releasing solo music later in the year. In early August, Nelson wiped her Instagram account in anticipation of her solo debut, titled "Boyz", which she confirmed US rapper Nicki Minaj featured on.

On 29 July 2022, it was announced that Nelson had split from Polydor Records, amid "creative differences" fourteen months after signing with them.

It was revealed in December 2022 that Nelson had filmed the video to her next single, titled "Cried Out".

Personal life
Nelson has said that being bullied at school may have contributed to her suffering from stress-induced alopecia as a teenager. In her BBC documentary Odd One Out, Nelson was vocal about her struggle with body image. She said she would starve herself before TV performances or video shoots, then later binge eat. She said that abuse from online trolls on Twitter drove her to attempt suicide in 2013, stating: "I felt that I physically couldn't tolerate the pain any more."

In 2014, Nelson began dating Rixton lead singer, Jake Roche. The couple became engaged on 19 July 2015, but broke up in November 2016. She had a brief relationship with Chris Clark in 2017, followed by a 16-month relationship with musician Harry James that ended in November 2018. In January 2019, Nelson began dating Love Island contestant Chris Hughes.  In April 2020, Nelson and Hughes broke up due to personal reasons. Four months later, she announced that she was in a relationship with actor Sean Sagar.

Nelson has 15 tattoos, including a quote on her upper right arm: "Music is the strongest form of magic".

In June 2018, Nelson posted an image of herself on Instagram wearing her hair in dreadlocks. The photo was later deleted after she was criticised over accusations of cultural appropriation. In May 2021, Nelson was accused of "blackfishing" (a form of cultural appropriation). Her name trended on Twitter after some users realised that she is white, having previously believed that Nelson was a woman of colour. A BuzzFeed article documented how Nelson had changed her physical appearance since joining Little Mix. The article suggested that darkening her skin tone and increasing her lip size had led Nelson to become racially ambiguous, also noting how her skin tone has frequently appeared darker than that of former colleagues Pinnock and Thirlwall, both of whom are women of colour. In 2021, after the release of "Boyz", Nelson faced criticism online for her appearance in the music video, with comments on her accent and darkened skin. This led to further accusations of blackfishing.

In November 2020, Little Mix's publicist stated that Nelson would take an extended break from the pop group for "private medical reasons". On 14 December 2020, Nelson announced her departure from Little Mix due to struggles with her mental health.

In August 2021, Nelson spoke in an interview about her time on The X Factor and criticised the show for the lack of support she received after being subjected to online trolling. In the interview she spoke about the eating disorder she had developed through extreme dieting during her time with Little Mix, and the panic attacks she would experience.

Online bullying and body image
In 2019, Nelson spoke about her experiences with body image and the impact of online bullying on her life and mental health. Before Little Mix's 2020 studio album Confetti was released, Nelson took some time out of the group's promotion schedule, citing a private medical matter. On 14 December 2020, she announced she was leaving the group due to the impact on her mental health. In a statement, she said: "I find the constant pressure of being in a girl group and living up to expectations very hard."

In August 2021, Nelson told The Guardian that since her first appearance on The X Factor with Little Mix she had been trolled about her physical appearance on social media. Although the group supported Nelson's frailties, she said that The X Factor should pair a therapist or psychologist with the coaches. Nelson underwent therapy, where she was told she had an eating disorder.

Nelson said that she was often dressed differently from the other three members of Little Mix because her body shape did not lend itself to the outfits. After the COVID-19 pandemic and the decision to shoot the video for "Sweet Melody" she had gained weight and did not feel fit for filming, deciding to go on a drastic diet without getting results. After she was hospitalised, her mother told the other members that she had to leave the group. She said that some backstage people associated with Little Mix were glad to see her go.

Discography

Singles

Songwriting credits

Filmography

Awards and nominations

References

External links

1991 births
Living people
21st-century English women singers
English women pop singers
Little Mix members
People from Romford
Singers from London
Victims of cyberbullying